Sabatier or Sabattier can refer to:

People

 Apollonie Sabatier, bohèmienne and muse to some artists in Paris around 1850/60.
 Armand Sabatier, French zoologist and photographer, discoverer of the Sabattier effect 
 François Sabatier, (born 1937), French musicologist
 Gabriel Sabattier (1892–1966), French general in World War II
 Léopold Sabatier, French colonial administrator in Kon Tum and Đắk Lắk Province
 Louis Auguste Sabatier, French Protestant theologian.
 Louis Rémy Sabattier (1863–1935), a French artist best known for his work for the magazine l'Illustration
 Paul Sabatier (theologian), French clergyman and historian.
 Paul Sabatier (chemist), Nobel-prize winning inventor of the Sabatier reaction.
 Raphaël Bienvenu Sabatier, French anatomist and surgeon.

Places

 Sabatier (crater), a lunar crater.
 Mount Sabatier, a peak on the Antarctic island of South Georgia.
 Paul Sabatier University, in Toulouse, France

Other

 Sabatier reaction, a method of producing methane in the presence of a catalyst.
 Sabattier effect, a photographic darkroom process (also known as pseudo-solarisation) that results in a partial image reversal.
 Sabatier, a high-quality brand of kitchen knife produced in France, used by several makers including:
 Sabatier Aîné & Perrier.
 Thiers Issard Sabatier.

See also

 
 
 
 

Occitan-language surnames